Thank God You're Here is an Australian television improvised comedy program created by Working Dog Productions, which premiered on Network Ten on 5 April 2006, and aired for the first three seasons and on Seven for the fourth season.

Each episode involves performers walking through a door into an unknown situation, greeted by the line "Thank God you're here!". They then had to improvise their way through the scene. At the end of each episode a winner was announced. It was the most successful new show in Australia of 2006, attracting an average of 1.7 million viewers after the first few episodes.

The show is hosted by Shane Bourne, and is judged by Tom Gleisner.  The format was sold for recreation in a number of countries.

Synopsis
Each contestant is dressed in appropriate costume, has some brief banter with the host, and is then invited to "walk through the blue door" onto a hidden set. They are greeted by the ensemble cast, in character, with the line "Thank God you're here!", and must then attempt to improvise their role in the scene. Typically they will be asked in-character questions by the ensemble cast and challenged to provide information about the scene, including the names of characters or objects.

At least twice during each episode (to cover set-up and costuming for the live audience), footage is shown of each of the four participants performing a challenge, often on location, which was filmed earlier in the week. These include a commentary booth where the contestants have to comment on an unfamiliar subject, an office where they are being interviewed or interrogated (by police, customs officials, etc.), showing customers things for sale (cars, boats, pianos, houses, etc.), or advertisements (e.g. slimming products, housing developments, etc.). The other characters in these scenes are generally played by members of the ensemble cast. The third series also introduced an additional segment in which Gleisner highlights a "real life" Thank God You're Here-style situation, such as the infamous Guy Goma BBC interview and frequently, that of politicians forced to improvise answers under pressure. The fourth season introduced a different segment, where Gleisner points out that he believes an Australian cricket player is able to endorse anything, and presents a falsified advertisement where a retired Australian cricketer (Damien Fleming) attempts to endorse an also falsified company of a completely random field (such as a French restaurant or sewage processing plant). Running gags in these segments include the cricketer comparing selecting such a company with his medium pace bowling, the use of "jargon" which actually is completely made-up, comparing the reliability (or other value) with his own bowling style, and a man named "Steve" who is called upon to agree with this previous statement ("bit like my bowling, eh, Steve?")

Finally, when all the contestants have played in a scene by themselves, all four enter a final scene together for the "all-in group challenge". At the end of the show, the judge declares a winner; this choice is entirely at the judge's discretion, and is largely arbitrary. Honorable and dishonorable mentions are also given, usually to contestants who do not win so that the judge can comment on their performances. The winner receives a trophy in the shape of the programme's blue door logo.

There are variations on the standard setup: occasionally the greeting will be slightly changed to better suit the setting (e.g. "Thank the gods you're here!" for a scene featuring Vikings or "Thank God you're alive" in a scene featuring a car accident), and often an alternative entrance will be built into the set. These are often used for comic effect, as in the aforementioned car accident scenario where the contestant (Matthew Newton) climbed through the back of the set and emerged from the door of a wrecked car embedded in the wall of a second-storey flat.

Ensemble cast
Although their parts are thoroughly scripted, the actors who interact with the guest stars in each scenario are drawn from an ensemble of experienced improvisational actors.

Improvisation experience is preferred so that the cast can react appropriately and immediately to the improvisations of the guest stars, though in most cases this improvisation is limited. This ensemble is also used in many of the mid-week assignments, fulfilling the roles of customers or members of the public with whom the guests must interact in a real-life setting.

The following are regular ensemble cast members who have appeared on the show.

 Andrew Bayly (Series 1 (Episode 2)–4)
 Ben Anderson (Series 2–4)
 Daniel Cordeaux
 Ed Kavalee
 Heidi Arena
 Isabella Dunwill (Series 2)
 Nicola Parry
 Rebekah Foord (Series 1 (Episode 3)–3 (Episode 1))
 Roz Hammond (Series 3–4)
 Simon Dowling (Series 1 (Episode 3)–4)
 Simon Russell (Series 2–4)

Several special guests have also appeared, either playing themselves or as part of the ensemble cast for a scene. Special guests have included Damien Fleming (Series 4), Dan O'Connor, Natalie Bassingthwaighte, Kate Ceberano, Alan Fletcher, Kimberley Davies, Matt Welsh, Mark Holden, Simon Burke, Greg Evans, Nikki Webster, Mick Molloy and The Veronicas. Other guests including Jane Hall, Andy Lee and former Burke's Backyard host Don Burke have appeared as mock presenters in the locational challenges.

Appearances

Episodes

Show promotion
Host Shane Bourne and Judge Tom Gleisner appeared on Rove Live on 11 April 2006, to promote the show after the first episode had screened. After an interview with Rove McManus, they participated in a game McManus called Where The Bloody Hell Have You Been, a play on words of the Australian tourism campaign, "So Where The Bloody Hell Are You?". In this game they had to perform, without preparation, a situation involving a funeral, and the reading of an improvised eulogy, following exactly the same format as Thank God You're Here.

Music
The main theme is "Come Anytime" by Hoodoo Gurus. A piece used throughout the interludes of the first Season of the show is "Don't You Know Who I Am", performed by Small Mercies.

In the second season, new music was also used in addition to the main themes:
 "Reminder" by Kisschasy
 "Pellet Gun" by Small Mercies

In the third season, more new music was used in addition to the main themes:
 "Everlasting" by Horsell Common
 "Beautiful Disguise" by Tokenview

Production and broadcast schedule

Series One (Early 2006)
The final episode of Season One, in which the actor Angus Sampson won, had 2.13 million viewers nationally.

Series Two (Late 2006)
The second series of the show ran from 6 September to 8 November 2006, at a 7:30 pm AEST timeslot. The ratings for the second season place the show in the top three shows watched in Australia boosting the ratings of follow-up show House on the network and placing the show up with ratings juggernaut Border Security: Australia's Front Line which broadcasts on the Seven Network. Thank God You're Here received an average of two million viewers every week. For the last episode of 2006 (8 November), had received ratings of 1.85 million viewers nationally.

Series Three (2007)
The first episode of Series Three was filmed on 21 June 2007. Guests for this episode included Stephen Curry, Josh Lawson, Peter Helliar and Cal Wilson. Series Three had begun at the same 7:30 pm time slot on Wednesday 11 July 2007.

Series Four (2009)
In late 2008, it was announced that the fourth season will be made which will air on the Seven Network instead of Network Ten. With Global Television Studios in Nunawading getting ready to shut down, Series 4 started filming at Melbourne Showgrounds in Flemington, in the shed normally used as the Poultry Pavilion. With the move from Nunawading also came a move from Global to Cutting Edge as the broadcast provider. Shooting started on Thursday 19 March 2009, in front of a live audience of 500 people. At the recording of episode 2 on 26 March, Tom Gleisner told the audience they couldn't find an available studio big enough for all their sets and large studio audience, so started looking at other types of venues, and found what they needed at the showgrounds. Portable buildings were set up outside the pavilion as offices, etc. Another vacant pavilion was used to house the audience before taping. The new venue was an issue for audio, as there was no soundproofing, so the nearby railway line often interfered with scenes, and Tom said if it rained, they would be "stuffed".

Ratings

Logie Awards
 Most Outstanding Comedy Program Logie, 2007
 Most Popular Light Entertainment Program Logie, 2006, 2007, 2008, 2010 (nominated)

Release

Home media
All series of the show have been released on DVD in Australia. Season 1 was released on 8 November 2006, Season 2 was released on 23 August 2007, Season 3 was released on 28 November 2007 and Season 4 was released on 5 November 2009.

Streaming
All series were released on Network 10's catch-up TV service 10Play in June and July 2020.

Board game
In early December 2009, the "Thank God You're Here" board game was released. It contains 70 different scenarios which can be acted out in the home, in a similar format to the show. The board game is being distributed in selected stores only, including What's New.

Possible revival
In 2014, co-creator Rob Sitch said that a revival of the program was possible.

After the series
In mid-December 2009, series 1-3 alumni Fifi Box was sign-off as a Weather Presenter and in January 2010, she was appointed as Entertainment Editor on Sunrise where she interviews celebrities and presents entertainment segments. So Fifi Box was replaced by Grant Denyer has returned to Sunrise for a new look as Weather Presenter on 25 January 2010. It was revealed in November 2010 that she was going to be co-host with Jules Lund on Fifi and Jules across the Today Network leaving Friday's show open for Hamish and Andy to do their show to this day here (February 2011). But Hamish and Andy will move from 4pm Monday, with she and Jules Lund taking 4pm-6pm on Tuesday-Friday with the drive show in a current place (February 2013).

In contrast, series 1 & 2 star Matthew Newton was announced in 2010 as the host for the auditions of the Australian version of The X Factor on the Seven Network. However, in August 2010, he was replaced by Luke Jacobz after Newton had two domestic violence incidents involving girlfriend Rachael Taylor at a hotel in Rome and if he had to quit The X Factor due to 'medical advice', he won't rely on. But, on December 4, 2011, he was assaulted a taxi driver twice in the Sydney suburb of Crows Nest. He has been charged with common assault and appeared in court in January 2012. The matter was originally stood over to April 2012, as he arrested in Miami, Florida and charged with trespassing and resisting officers. In a second incident on 17 April, he was charged with battery and resisting arrest after he attacked a hotel receptionist and his lawyer tweeted for patience and support for bipolar sufferers and said that if he is continuing treatment, he couldn't recover them.

In addition, Australian comedians including Anh Do, Rebel Wilson, Peter Helliar and Heath Franklin went to Seven to representing the show Australia Versus premiered in July 2010.

In June 2011, comedian Colin Lane was announced that will host Network Ten's Ready Steady Cook succeeding the former host Peter Everett. But in 2013, the show was axed after 9 years.

In September 2011, Merrick Watts hosts a drive & night show called Merrick and the Highway Patrol along with co-hosts Rachel Corbett and Julian 'Jules' Schiller on Triple M Radio. However, in November 2013, the radio program was cancelled due to poor ratings and came to an end. He co-host the new Breakfast program on 2Day FM alongside Jules Lund & Sophie Monk with Mel B, replacing The Kyle and Jackie O Show from 2014.

In 2012, Shaun Micallef hosts Shaun Micallef's Mad as Hell on the ABC TV.

Osher 'Andrew G' Günsberg hosted Network Ten's Bachelor franchises from 2013. both The Bachelor and The Bachelorette.

In August 2013, Cal Wilson and Toby Truslove to captain SlideShow with Grant Denyer as host on the Seven Network, which is aired for one season.

In early 2015, Julia Morris along with Chris Brown to currently co-hosted I'm a Celebrity...Get Me Out of Here Australia in South Africa.

Guest star Angus Sampson announced in 2015, as he starred on the FX hit show Fargo, playing the character Bear Gerhardt.

In October 2017, Dave Hughes hosts the Network Ten panel show Hughesy, We Have a Problem.

Actress Robyn Butler along with Andy Lee and Laurence Boxhall as team captains along with Shaun Micallef as host on the relaunched TV series Talkin' 'Bout Your Generation on the Nine Network announced in 2017 and premiered in May 2018.

In February 2019, Jo Stanley was announced as co-host of the Seven Network's lifestyle program The House of Wellness alongside Luke Darcy, Rachael Finch and Luke Hines.

In April 2019, comedian Hamish Blake hosts Lego Masters Australia with judge Ryan "The Brickman" McNaught broadcast on the Nine Network.

More than 200 towns affected by the 2019–20 Black Summer Bushfires and to celebrate the relief, there are a list of events such as Comedy for Bushfire Relief with Peter Rowsthorn, Stand Up for Bushfire Relief (featuring Arj Barker, Dave Hughes, Frank Woodley and Cal Wilson), Love From London (featuring Adam Hills), Comedy Steps Up for Bushfire Relief (featuring Julia Morris, Arj Barker and Carl Barron), The Wiggles Reunion (featuring Anthony Field) and Aussie Bushfire Relief with Ryan Shelton, plus live television events like the Bushfire Appeal Telethon as New Year's Eve 2019 broadcast live from the Sydney Opera House, The Big Appeal cricket match, The Aces for Bushfire Relief tennis match, The AFL State of Origin for Bushfire Relief Match, The Netball's Bushfire Relief Match and The Fire Fight Australia Concert in Sydney's ANZ Stadium. The highest event that what's making news during the Black Summer Bushfires to raise their money for the Australian Red Cross and other charities that are shown. The SES contributing our staff at some events and the news channels about the Australian Bushfires all around the world were thriving. The world that viewed some major events rated too highly than that. The newspapers about the Bushfire Relief focused some lives are lost as the events are go ahead. Apart from the guest stars, none of the other scenarios in series 1, 2, 3 or 4 are still filming.

International versions
The format has been sold to Fremantle for worldwide distribution and has subsequently been sold for creation in 18 countries including the United States.  International versions are required to use the same sketch premises used on the original Australian version and if one wants to alter one of their episodes in some way, such as taping a Christmas-themed episode, they must go through Fremantle for permission to do so.

 The original Australian version entered repeat broadcast on 13 January 2015 on Foxtel's Comedy Channel.
 The Czech version of the show, "Konečně jsi tady" was first aired on TV Prima on 4 March 2007. The show was later put on hold to change it to better suit the Czech viewers.
 The Dutch version, "Gelukkig Je Bent Er" broadcast its first episode on RTL 4 in late September 2006, followed by "Gu' ske lov du kom" on Danish TV3 a few days later.
 The German version, "Gott sei Dank... dass Sie da sind!", piloted in July 2006, premiered on 30 November 2006, in primetime on German channel ProSieben, produced by local Fremantle daughter Grundy LE, but managed only to attract a small audience. It was cancelled after 6 episodes.
 The Russian version of the show, "Slava Bogu, ty prishyol" was first aired on STS channel on 24 September 2006. Five seasons with the last shown in 2010 spring  have been produced. The premiere of the updated show was held 26 October 2018 at 22:00
 The Swedish version, "Tack gode Gud" was first aired on TV4 on 21 March 2007. It follows the same format as the Australian version and regularly uses similar scenarios.
 The American version was picked up by NBC after a pilot was shot on 9 November 2006, overseen by Rob Sitch, who flew to Los Angeles. It was hosted by American actor and comedian David Alan Grier and judged by Canadian actor and comedian Dave Foley. The program premiered on 9 April 2007 with two back-to-back episodes (including the pilot). It followed the Australian format closely, with the additional quirks of the guests swearing they had not seen the sets or costumes at the start of the show, and host Grier appearing in a cameo for one scenario each episode. Though it managed to attract some fairly high-profile guests, including Tom Green, Fran Drescher and Wayne Knight (who appeared twice), NBC announced it had cancelled the show after just seven episodes on 14 May 2007.
 The British version premiered on 12 January 2008 on ITV. The show was made by Talkback Thames, a FremantleMedia company. Paul Merton was both the host and also featured in his own scenes. Hamish Blake has appeared on the first two episodes.
 The Vietnamese version from season 6 on does not have a true judge - the hosts also takes charge of pressing the buzzer to end the scene. Instead, audiences in the studio are the ones who makes the decision by voting for contestants after each of their scene has finished.

References

External links
 

2006 Australian television series debuts
2009 Australian television series endings
Australian comedy television series
Network 10 original programming
Seven Network original programming
Logie Award for Most Outstanding Comedy Program winners
Television series by Fremantle (company)
Television shows set in Melbourne
English-language television shows
Improvisational television series